A volcanologist, or volcano scientist, is a geologist who focuses on understanding the formation and eruptive activity of volcanoes. Volcanologists frequently visit volcanoes, sometimes active ones, to observe and monitor volcanic eruptions, collect eruptive products including tephra (such as ash or pumice), rock and lava samples. One major focus of inquiry in recent times is the prediction of eruptions to alleviate the impact on surrounding populations and monitor natural hazards associated with volcanic activity. Geologists who research volcanic materials that make up the solid Earth are referred to as igneous petrologists.

Etymology 

The word volcanologist (or vulcanologist) is derived from the English volcanology (volcano + -logy), which was derived from the French volcanologie (or vulcanologie), which was further derived from the French word volcan (volcano), which was even further derived from Vulcanus, the Latin name of the Roman god of fire and metalworking. The Latin word is of Estrucan origin, but unknown meaning.

Job overview

Job description 
Volcanologists research many aspects of volcanic processes to better understand planetary formation or to monitor current and future volcanic eruptions in order to protect citizens living in volcanic hazard zones. Volcanologists work at universities, museums or other national research institutes (often including volcano observatories), or in industry. Volcanologists working in academia will be usually involved in teaching geology classes if based at a university (lecturer or professor), running of laboratory experiments, data collection, and writing of scientific peer-reviewed papers for the scientific community to critique and advance knowledge and discovery. Volcanologists working for volcano observatories and museums work in close collaboration with academic researchers, but day-to-day tasks may also include the collection and curation of volcanic samples, writing of reports from monitoring stations, and public outreach relating to volcanic hazards and climate  change

Sub-disciplines of volcanology 
 Igneous petrologist
 Physical volcanogist - someone who typically studies the physical characteristics of volcanic ash deposits and rocks.
 Experimental petrologist - someone who simulates volcanic and magmatic processes in a laboratory (are often specialists in thermodynamics applied to Earth processes).
 Geochemist - those who study the chemical composition of volcanic rocks and gases (see also isotope geochemistry). Geochemists often use mass spectrometry and electron microprobe analysis to understand the pre-eruption history of volcanic rocks and how fast eruptions occur.
 Volcano geophysicist (or volcano seismologist)
 Planetary volcanologist - someone who studies volcanic processes on other planetary bodies.

History

Notable volcanologists (currently active) 

 Haraldur Sigurdsson (1939-), Icelandic volcanologist and geochemist
 Bill McGuire (born 1954)
 Keith Rowley (born 1949; Prime Minister of Trinidad and Tobago since 2015)
Robert Stephen John Sparks Chaning Wills Professor of Geology in the Department of Earth Sciences at the University of Bristol.
Donald B. Dingwell (born 1958 in Corner Brook, Newfoundland, Canada) is a geoscientist, the director of the Department of Earth and Environmental Sciences and Ordinarius for Mineralogy and Petrology of the Ludwig Maximilian University of Munich 
Katharine Cashman is an American volcanologist, professor of volcanology at the University of Bristol 
Terry Plank an American geochemist, volcanologist and professor of Earth science at Columbia College, Columbia University, and the Lamont Doherty Earth Observatory
Richard Arculus is an Australian petrologist and volcanologist, formerly a professor of the School of Earth Sciences at the Australian National University.
Rosaly Lopes (born 8 January 1957 in Rio de Janeiro, Brazil) is a Senior Scientist at NASA's Jet Propulsion Laboratory specializing in planetary geology and volcanology
Clive Oppenheimer (born 1964) is a British volcanologist, and Professor of Volcanology in the Department of Geography of the University of Cambridge
Tamsin Mather British Professor of Earth Sciences at the Department of Earth Sciences, University of Oxford. She studies volcanic processes and their impacts on the Earth's environment and has appeared on the television and radio
Marie Edmonds (born 14 September 1975) is a Professor of volcanology and geology at the University of Cambridge whose research focuses on the physics and chemistry of volcanic eruptions and magmatism and understanding volatile cycling in the solid Earth as mediated by plate tectonics 
Jani Radebaugh American planetary scientist and professor of geology at Brigham Young University
Lindy Elkins-Tanton, planetary scientist and professor with expertise in planet formation and evolution.  She is the Director of the School of Earth and Space Exploration at Arizona State University (ASU) in Tempe, Arizona, Principal Investigator of NASA's Psyche mission, and former director of the Carnegie Institution for Science's Department of Terrestrial Magnetism.
Jenni Barclay, professor of volcanology at the University of East Anglia. She works on ways to mitigate volcanic risks, the interactions between rainfall and volcanic activity and the communication of volcanic hazards in the Caribbean
Claire Horwell, professor of Geohealth in the Department of Earth Sciences and Institute of Hazard, Risk and Resilience at Durham University and the founding Director of the International Volcanic Health Hazard Network (IVHHN). She studies the health hazards of natural and industrial mineral dusts

Notable volcanologists

Plato (428–348 BC)
Pliny the Elder (23–79 AD)
Pliny the Younger (61 – )
George-Louis Leclerc, Comte de Buffon (1707–1788)
James Hutton (1726–1797)
Déodat Gratet de Dolomieu (1750–1801)
George Julius Poulett Scrope (1797–1876)
Giuseppe Mercalli (1850–1914)
Alfred Lacroix  (1863–1948)
Frank A. Perret (1867–1943)
Thomas Jaggar (1871–1953), founder of the Hawaiian Volcano Observatory
Alfred Rittmann (1893–1980)
Sigurður Þórarinsson (1912–1983),
Haroun Tazieff (1914–1998), advisor to the French Government and Jacques Cousteau
George P. L. Walker (1926–2005), pioneering volcanologist who transformed the subject into a quantitative science
Katia and Maurice Krafft (1942–1991 and 1946–1991, respectively), died at Mount Unzen in Japan, 1991
Peter Francis (1944–1999)
David A. Johnston (1949–1980), killed during the 1980 eruption of Mount St. Helens
Harry Glicken (1958–1991), died at Mount Unzen in Japan by Pyroclastic flow, 1991

See also 

 Volcanology
 Volcanism
Igneous Petrology

References

External links 
 Volcano Live- What is a volcanologist?
 Environmental Science- How to Become a Volcanologist

Science occupations